Tadji may refer to:
Tadji, Iraq, a town in Iraq
Tadji, Papua New Guinea, a town in Papua New Guinea